James Eldridge "Hack" Miller (February 13, 1913 – November 21, 1966) was an American catcher in Major League Baseball who played for the Detroit Tigers in  and . He also played 12 seasons in minor league baseball.

Born in Celeste, Texas, Miller grew up in Abilene and attended North Texas State and Southeast Oklahoma State Teachers College before beginning his pro baseball career as an outfielder in 1935; he made the transition to catching in 1938. He played in seven Major League games in his career, batting .444 with one home run and four runs batted in; the home run came in his first career at-bat on April 23, 1944 against the Cleveland Indians and lefthander Al Smith. After his playing career ended, Miller managed minor league teams in various Texas cities including Lubbock, Tyler, Wichita Falls, Abilene and Big Spring.

He was on the Tigers' roster for the 1945 World Series win over the Chicago Cubs, but did not appear in any games.

He died at age 53 in Dallas and was buried at Hillcrest Cemetery in Forney, Kaufman County, Texas.

See also
Home run in first Major League at-bat

References

External links

1913 births
1966 deaths
Baseball players from Texas
Buffalo Bisons (minor league) players
Dallas Eagles players
Detroit Tigers players
Longview Cannibals players
Lubbock Hubbers players
Major League Baseball catchers
Meridian Bears players
Meridian Eagles players
Minor league baseball managers
North Texas Mean Green baseball players
People from Celeste, Texas
Shreveport Sports players
Southeastern Oklahoma State Savage Storm baseball players
Sportspeople from Abilene, Texas
Tyler Trojans players
Wichita Falls Spudders players